West Nile rebellion may refer to:

 Fighting in northwestern Uganda during the Ugandan Bush War
 Insurgencies of the UNRF II and West Nile Bank Front